The Katsonis class was a French-built class of two submarines for the Hellenic Navy, serving from 1927–28 until the Second World War. The ships of the class were the first new submarines acquired by Greece after the First World War.

Appearance and characteristics 
In general, they were similar to the French Navy's s, of Schneider-Laubeuf design, but the conning tower was larger in order to accommodate the rotating platform of the 100 mm gun.

Ships

References 

 
France–Greece relations